The 2016 Democrats Abroad presidential primary took place on March 1–8, 2016. E-mail, fax, and postal voting were carried out from January 11 to March 8, while in-person voting took place from March 1–8. Results were released on March 21.

Global presidential primary

Voters may only vote once for a presidential candidate, either through Democrats Abroad, or through their home state. Those who vote in the Democrats Abroad Global Presidential Primary may continue to participate in their home state's primary or caucus for all other candidates for the United States Senate and United States House of Representatives, and also for state and local elections and ballot measures, but they cannot vote twice for a presidential candidate.

Candidates
Four candidates and an "uncommitted" option were printed on the Global Presidential Primary ballot PDF file, in the following name and sorting format:

Forum

A "Global Town Hall" online videoconference was held on February 21. The Sanders and Clinton campaigns participated. De La Fuente never appeared on the list of participants, and O'Malley withdrew from the race after the Iowa caucus on February 1.

The Clinton campaign was represented by Jake Sullivan and Madeleine Albright as Clinton was absent from the town hall and attended a private fundraiser instead.

The Sanders campaign was represented by Bernie Sanders himself.

Local gatherings
Wellington, New Zealand cast the "First in the World" votes at midnight on Super Tuesday, March 1. A total of 28 ballots were cast: 21 for Sanders, 6 for Clinton, and 1 spoiled ballot.

In Singapore, Democrats Abroad held a voting session on March 7, hosting a Super Tuesday presentation by KKR Director of Asia Pacific Public Affairs, Steven Okun, who under President Bill Clinton had served as Deputy General Counsel at the Department of Transportation.

Voting centers
A number of cities hosted walk-in voting centers, and an official list of locations and open hours were made available as of February 6.

 Canberra (ACT Chapter)
 Sydney (NSW Chapter)
 Melbourne (VIC Chapter)

 Vienna

 Brussels

 Port Maitland, Nova Scotia (Atlantic Chapter)
 Calgary (Calgary Chapter)
 Burlington (Hamilton Chapter)
 Hamilton (Hamilton Chapter)
 Kitchener/Waterloo (Hamilton Chapter)
 London (London Chapter)
 Montreal (Montreal Chapter)
 Fort Erie (Niagara Region Chapter)
 Niagara Falls (Niagara Region Chapter)
 Toronto (Toronto Chapter)
 Vancouver (Vancouver Chapter)
 Victoria (Victoria Chapter)

 Santiago

 Taipei

 Escazú
 Grecia
 Pérez Zeledón
 Quepos
 San José

 Prague

 Copenhagen

 Bani
 Santiago de los Caballeros
 Santo Domingo

 Avignon (Avignon Chapter)
 Bordeaux (Bordeaux Chapter)
 Aix-en-Provence (Marseille Chapter)
 Marseille (Marseille Chapter)
 Caen (Normandy Chapter)
 Paris
 Grenoble (Rhone Alps Chapter)
 Nice (Riviera Chapter)
 Strasbourg (Strasbourg Chapter)
 Toulouse (Toulouse Chapter)

 Berlin (Berlin Chapter)
 Frankfurt (Frankfurt Chapter)
 Göttingen (Göttingen Chapter)
 Hamburg (Hamburg Chapter)
 Heidelberg (Heidelberg Chapter)
 Landstuhl (Kaiserslautern Chapter)
 Munich (Munich Chapter)
 Nuremberg (Munich Chapter)
 Augsburg (Munich Chapter)
 Cologne/Bonn (NRW Chapter)
 Düsseldorf (NRW Chapter)
 Stuttgart (Stuttgart Chapter)
 Wiesbaden (Wiesbaden/Mainz Chapter)

 Athens

 La Antigua

 Hong Kong

 Budapest

 Bangalore
 Kolkata
 Mumbai
 New Delhi

 Dublin
 Galway

 Florence (Florence Chapter)
 Milan (Milan Chapter)
 Naples (Rome Chapter)
 Rome (Rome Chapter)

 Nagoya
 Osaka (Kansai Chapter)
 Tokyo (Kanto Chapter)

 Luxembourg City

 Puerto Vallarta (Costa Banderas Chapter)
 Ajijic (Lake Chapala Chapter)
 Mazatlan (Mazatlan Chapter)
 Mexico City
 San Miguel de Allende (San Miguel de Allende Chapter)

 Amsterdam
 The Hague

 Auckland
 Wellington

 Oslo

 Panama City

 Lima

 Ortigas, Metro Manila

 Cascais
 Lisbon

 Moscow

 Singapore

 Barcelona (Barcelona Chapter)
 Madrid (Madrid Chapter)

 Stockholm (Stockholm Chapter)
 Gothenburg (Western Sweden Chapter)
 Halmstad (Western Sweden Chapter)
 Uddevalla (Western Sweden Chapter)

 Geneva
 Zurich

 Bangkok
 Chiang Mai (Chiang Mai Chapter)
 Pattaya (Pattaya and Eastern Seaboard Chapter)

 Cambridge (Cambridge Chapter)
 London
 Oxford (Oxford Chapter)
 Edinburgh (Scotland Chapter)
 St. Andrews (Scotland Chapter)

 Kiev

 Abu Dhabi
 Dubai

 Ho Chi Minh City

Provisional results

Provisional results were the ballot counts for individual walk-in voting centers. Ballots sent by post, fax, and e-mail were not included.

Problems

Voting center cancellation 
The scheduled March 1 voting location in Ho Chi Minh City, Vietnam, was cancelled without prior notice.  On March 3, the organizers posted an apology on Facebook.

Invalidation of ballots 

The Global Council of Democrats Abroad may be invalidating all ballots from the March 5 voting center in Moscow, Russia. This is due to the event being held at a different location than the location on the official list of voting centers.

E-mail voting failure 
The email system for accepting ballots was down for several hours on March 7, due to the system exceeding its daily bandwidth limit of 4000 MB at FastMail.

Results

Postal mail ballots were to be dated no later than March 8, and were collected until 6 PM local time on March 13. The results of all ballots was scheduled for March 21.

Democrats Abroad will send 21 delegates (13 pledged, 8 unpledged/superdelegates) to the 2016 Democratic National Convention. Each of the 8 unpledged delegates will cast a 1/2 vote, for a total of 4 delegate votes (21 pledged and unpledged delegates, 17 delegate votes).

The results were released on March 21

Results by country/region 

* NCC = Non-Country Committee

** EMEA = Europe, Middle East, and Africa

See also
 Democratic Party presidential primaries, 2016

References

External links
 Democrats Abroad Global Presidential Primary

Democrats Abroad
2016
March 2016 events in the United States